Gérardo Apruzzese (24 December 1902 – 11 May 1990) was a French wrestler. He competed in the Greco-Roman bantamweight at the 1924 Summer Olympics.

References

External links
 

1902 births
1990 deaths
Olympic wrestlers of France
Wrestlers at the 1924 Summer Olympics
French male sport wrestlers
Place of birth missing